Chloè Mortaud (born 19 September 1989, Lisieux, Calvados) is a French actress and beauty pageant titleholder who won Miss France 2009. She represented the Albigeois Midi Pyrénées, a southwest region of France, and became the first winner of the Miss France beauty pageant to have dual citizenship, French and American. Mortaud received US citizenship through her mother, an African American who emigrated from Mississippi to France, and has a grandmother who lives in Los Angeles. Her father is French and she has a younger brother Grégoire Mortaud.

Miss Universe 2009
Mortaud represented France at the Miss Universe 2009 pageant and finished in 6th place overall barely missing the top 5 by a mere one-fifth of a point (0.219). This pageant was won by Venezuelan Stefanía Fernández.

Miss World 2009
Mortaud became a finalist at Miss World 2009 (3rd runner-up) finals on 12 December 2009. She also placed 3rd runner up at the Miss World Beach Beauty competition and placed among the top 12 in the Miss World Top Model competition. Out of seven delegates who competed at Miss Universe 2009 and Miss World 2009, only Chloé and Miss South Africa Tatum Keshwar made the finals in both pageants.

After Miss France
In 2017, Chloé joined journalist Christophe Roux as the French commentators for Miss Universe 2016 in the Philippines, which aired live in France on Paris Première.  She became overly emotional when French hopeful Iris Mittenaere was crowned the winner.

References

1989 births
Living people
People from Lisieux
Miss France winners
French people of African-American descent
Miss Universe 2009 contestants
Miss World 2009 delegates